The Triarchy of Negroponte was a crusader state established on the island of Euboea after the partition of the Byzantine Empire following the Fourth Crusade. Partitioned into three baronies (terzieri, "thirds") (Chalkis, Karystos and Oreos) run by a few interrelated Lombard families, the island soon fell under the influence of the Republic of Venice. From circa 1390, the island became a regular Venetian colony as the Realm of Negroponte.

History

Establishment 
According to the division of Byzantine territory (the Partitio terrarum imperii Romaniae), Euboea was awarded to Boniface of Montferrat, King of Thessalonica. Boniface in turn ceded the island as a fief to the Flemish noble Jacques II of Avesnes, who fortified the capital Chalkis.
 
After his death in mid-1205 however, the island was ceded to three Veronese barons: Ravano dalle Carceri, Giberto dalle Carceri and Pecoraro da Mercanuovo. They divided the island into three triarchies (terzieri, "thirds"): the northern, based at Oreos, the southern, ruled from Karystos and the central portion, ruled from Chalkis. The city of Chalkis or Negroponte (città de' Lombardi, "city of the Lombards") however was not under the latter's control, but served as overall capital of the island and joint residence of the Lombard rulers and their families. By 1209 however, Ravano had established himself as sole master of Euboea, styling himself as dominus insulae Nigropontis.

Having allied himself with an unsuccessful Lombard rebellion against the Latin Emperor, Henry of Flanders, Ravano was eager to find a powerful protector. Thus, in March 1209, he signed an alliance with Venice, which recognized Venetian overlordship and gave the Venetians significant commercial privileges. In May, however, in an act of political balancing, Ravano also acknowledged his vassalage to the Latin Empire.

Succession disputes 
 
However, already after the death of Ravano in 1216, his heirs disagreed over the succession, allowing the Venetian bailo to intervene as a mediator. He partitioned the three baronies in two, creating thus six hexarchies (sestieri). The northern triarchy of Oreos was divided between Ravano's nephews, Marino I and Rizzardo; the southern triarchy of Karystos was divided between his widow, Isabella, and his daughter, Bertha; and the central triarchy was divided between Giberto's heirs, Guglielmo I and Alberto. Provisions were also made that in the case someone among the sestieri died, his inheritor would be the other sestiere of the respective triarchy, and not his children. In fact, most sestieri were succeeded by their brothers, sons or nephews, keeping the baronies within the tight circle of the original Lombard families.

In 1255 however, the death of Carintana dalle Carceri, hexarch of Oreos and wife to William II of Villehardouin, nominal overlord of Negroponte, led to the so-called "War of the Euboeote Succession", which involved the Principality of Achaea and Venice. William claimed for himself his wife's inheritance, while the Lombard barons were unwilling to concede it. On 14 June 1256, Guglielmo of Verona and Narzotto dalle Carceri, the other two triarchs, repudiated their allegiance to William and pledged themselves to Venice. William responded by capturing Chalkis, which the Venetians retook in early 1258. The war ended in the battle of Karydi in May/June 1258, where William defeated the Duke of Athens, Guy I de la Roche, who had allied himself with the rebellious triarchs. Finally, in August 1259, Doge Reniero Zeno negotiated a peace, followed by a treaty in 1262, which recognized William's suzerainty over the island, but not his possession of the triarchy of Oreoi.

Byzantine interlude 
By that time, however, the Empire of Nicaea had established itself as the foremost power in the area of the former Byzantine Empire, reconquering several territories from the Latins. Its successes culminated in the recapture of Constantinople in 1261 and the reestablishment of the Byzantine Empire, whose energetic ruler, Michael VIII Palaeologus, sought to reconquer the remaining Latin principalities in southern Greece. To this end, he accepted the services of Licario, an Italian renegade, who had his base near Karystos. Under Licario's command, Byzantine troops soon conquered most of Euboea, except Chalkis.
 
After the departure of Licario sometime after 1280 however, with Venetian aid, the island gradually returned to Latin control. By 1296, Boniface of Verona had completely expelled the Byzantines from Euboea.

Later history 
In 1317 however, Karystos fell to the Catalan Company of Don Alfonso Fadrique, royal vicar-general (governor) of the duchy of Athens and illegitimate son of Frederick III of Sicily. In 1319, a peace treaty was signed between Venice and Don Alfonso, whereby he retained Karystos, which the Venetians acquired in 1365.
 
When the last triarchs, Niccolò III dalle Carceri and Giorgio III Ghisi, died in 1383 and 1390 respectively, they left their territories to Venice, which thus established complete predominance over the island. Nevertheless, the triarchic system was maintained, with Venetian families appointed to the positions of terzieri, while the Venetian podestà (magistrate) resided at Chalkis.
 
Venice's rule lasted until 1470, when, during the Ottoman–Venetian War of 1463–1479, Sultan Mehmed II campaigned against Chalkis. With the fall of the city on 12 July, the whole island came under Ottoman control. The city's fall is the subject of the Rossini opera Maometto II.

List of rulers of Negroponte 
Note: The sequence of rulers during the 13th century, as well as the familial relations between them, are not very clear, as information about Euboea's internal history is scarce to non-existent, especially for the period 1216–1255. According to the rules of succession laid down on the island's division into thirds and sixths in 1216, on the death of a hexarch, he was succeeded in his domain by his fellow hexarch within their third, and not by the former's heirs.

Notes

References

Sources and bibliography 
 
 
 
 
 
 
 
 
 

 
States of Frankish and Latin Greece
Kingdom of Thessalonica
Former countries in the Balkans
1204 establishments in Europe
States and territories established in 1204
1470 disestablishments in Europe
Former monarchies